Viesīte Parish is an administrative unit of Jēkabpils Municipality in the Selonia region of Latvia. It was created in 2010 from the countryside territory of Viesīte town. At the beginning of 2014, the population of the parish was 704.

Towns, villages and settlements of Viesīte parish 
 Eķengrāve
 Jodeļi
 Vārnava
 Viesīte - parish administrative center

References

External links

Parishes of Latvia
Jēkabpils Municipality
Selonia